The year 2016 was the 45th year after the independence of Bangladesh. It was also the third year of the third term of the Government of Sheikh Hasina.

Incumbents

 President: Abdul Hamid
 Prime Minister: Sheikh Hasina
 Chief Justice: Surendra Kumar Sinha

Demography

Climate

Cyclone

On 21 May, Cyclone Roanu made landfall near Chittagong, Bangladesh. A storm surge up to 7 ft (2.0 m) above the astronomical tide hit the coast of Bangladesh at afternoon.
The cyclone approached the land over the coast at Sandwip, Hatia, Kutubdia, Sitakundu and Feni. 30 people died when Roanu hit the county, most of them died when the cyclone's storm surge overtopped dams. Around 40,000 homesteads and business houses were damaged.

The storm disrupted electricity supply and road communications in the areas. Food storage, seasonal crops were damaged. Livestock, including fish and shrimp firms were swept away. Damage in Chittagong and Cox's Bazar were about ৳250 crore (US$31.8 million).

Economy

Note: For the year 2016 average official exchange rate for BDT was 78.65 per US$.

Events

 4 February - ‍Hackers breached into the Bangladesh Bank's system and managed to transfer $101 million to entities in the Philippines and Sri Lanka from the bank's account with the Federal Reserve Bank of New York.
 9 March - An Antonov An-26 cargo aircraft, operated by True Aviation, crashed in the Bay of Bengal, five minutes after takeoff from Cox's Bazar Airport,
 20 March - Murder of Sohagi Jahan Tonu sparks country wide protest.
 2 April - A protest movement broke out against a Bangladeshi-Chinese consortium's acquisition of agricultural lands, graveyards and homes to build a coal-based power plant in the Banshkhali Upazila of Chittagong. When the owners and engineers of the plant attempted to visit the construction site, protesters swooped down on the officials' motorcade. Police cracked down on the protesters, arresting seven. Angry at the arrests, local residents called for a public gathering on 4 April.
 4 April - Awami League leaders called a meeting at the same place where Banshkhali power plant movement organizers were gathering. Local police invoked a Section 144 law restricting public gatherings in the area. When local residents gathered to protest, police opened fire and killed at least five people.
 23 April - A. F. M. Rezaul Karim Siddique, a professor of English at Rajshahi University died in an attack suspected to have been carried out by Islamist militants.
 25 April - Xulhaz Mannan, an employee of the United States embassy in Dhaka and the founder of Bangladesh's first and only LGBT-themed magazine Roopbaan was killed in his apartment along with another LGBT activist Mahbub Rabbi Tonoy in a machete attack by Islamist extremists.
 11 May - Former Minister and leader of the Bangladesh Jamaat-e-Islami, Motiur Rahman Nizami executed by hanging at Dhaka Central Jail.
 1 July - Twenty two civilians, including seventeen foreigners, and two police officers are killed, and 14 taken hostage in a terror attack at the Holey Artisan Bakery in Gulshan Thana in Dhaka. The attack started at about 21:40 local time and the hostage situation lasted overnight.
 2 July - Members of Bangladesh Army, Navy, Air Force, Border Guards, Police, Combat Police, Rapid Action Battalion, SWAT and joint forces conducted the rescue operation at the Holey Artisan Bakery at 07:40 local time. Thirteen hostages were rescued. Five of the attackers were killed in a gunfight with the commandos, while the sixth was captured alive.
 27 August - Alleged emir of the Islamic State (IS) in Bangladesh and mastermind of the July 2016 Dhaka attack at the Gulshan café, Tamim Ahmed Chowdhury killed in a raid on an IS safehouse in Dhaka by Bangladeshi forces.
 3 September - Former director of Islami Bank, and chairman of the Diganta Media Corporation, Mir Quasem Ali hanged at Gazipur after his final appeal was rejected by the Supreme Court of Bangladesh.
 1 November - Bangladesh recorded their first ever test win against England during a bilateral cricket series.

Awards and Recognitions

Independence Day Award

Ekushey Padak
Ekushey Padak was awarded to 16 people.
 Kazi Ebadul Haque, language movement
 Sayed Haider, language movement
 Syed Golam Kibria, language movement (posthumous)
 Jasim Uddin Ahmed, language movement
 Jahanara Ahmed, arts (television and film)
 Pandit Amaresh Roy Chowdhury, arts (classical music)
 Shaheen Samad, arts (music)
 Amanul Haque, arts (dance)
 Kazi Anowar Hossain, arts (painting) (posthumous)
 Mofidul Hoque, Liberation War
 Toab Khan, journalism
 ABM Abdullah, research
 Mongsen Ching Monsin, research
 Jyoti Prakash Dutta, language and literature
 Hayat Mamud, language and literature
 Habibullah Siraji, language and literature

Sports
 Olympics:
Bangladesh competed at the 2016 Summer Olympics in Rio de Janeiro, Brazil, from 5 to 21 August, but did not win any medal in the competition.
 South Asian (Federation) Games:
Bangladesh participated in the South Asian Games held in Guwahati and Shillong, India. Bangladesh won 4 golds, 15 silvers and 56 bronzes to finish the tournament at the fifth position in overall points table.
 Football:
 Bangladesh hosted 2016 Bangabandhu Cup in January. Nepal won the tournament.  
 Dhaka Abahani won Premier League title.
 Cricket:
2016 Asia Cup was held in Bangladesh from 24 February to 6 March. It was the 13th edition of the Asia Cup, the fifth to be held in Bangladesh, and the first to be played using the T20I format. India beat Bangladesh by 8 wickets in the final to win their sixth Asia Cup title.
The English cricket team toured Bangladesh in October to play three One Day Internationals (ODIs), two Test matches and three tour matches. England won the ODI series 2–1. The Test series finished 1–1, with Bangladesh recording their first ever Test win against England when they won the second Test by 108 runs.

Deaths 

 24 February - Abul Kalam Mohammed Zakaria, archaeologist (b. 1918)
 24 February - A. K. N. Ahmed, economist (b. 1931)
 10 March - Robin Ghosh, music composer (b. 1939)
 12 March - Rafiq Azad, poet and a freedom fighter (b. 1942)
 19 March - Rashiduddin Ahmad, neurosurgeon (b. 1937)
 20 March - Parveen Sultana Diti, actor (b. 1965)
 30 March - Mohammad Ferdous Khan, educationist
 16 May - Sadek Khan, journalist (b. 1933)
 23 May - Nurjahan Begum, journalist (b, 1925)
 16 July -  M. A. Mannan, neurologist (b. 1932)
 4 September - M. Abdur Rahim, politician (b. 1927)
 27 September - Syed Shamsul Haque, poet and writer (b. 1935)

See also
 2010s in Bangladesh
 List of Bangladeshi films of 2016
 2015–16 Bangladeshi cricket season
 Timeline of Bangladeshi history

References

 
Bangladesh
Bangladesh
2010s in Bangladesh
Years of the 21st century in Bangladesh